Fulvio Francesconi (born 19 November 1944), is a retired Italian professional footballer who played as a midfielder.

Career
Francesconi played for 7 seasons (131 games, 23 goals) in the Serie A for Italian clubs A.S. Roma and U.C. Sampdoria.

Honours

Club
Roma
 Coppa Italia winner: 1963–64.

Individual
 Serie B top scorer: 1966–67 (20 goals).

References

1944 births
Living people
Italian footballers
Serie A players
Como 1907 players
A.S. Roma players
U.C. Sampdoria players
Catania S.S.D. players
A.C. Reggiana 1919 players
Association football midfielders